Carl Gottlieb Guttenberg (also Carl-Gottlieb, Carl Gottfried) (near Nuremberg, 21 August 1743–Paris, 20 May 1790) was a German draughtsman and engraver.  He received his initial training in Nuremberg and Bern before traveling to Paris in 1767 to study under the engraver Jean Georges Wille.  After a brief sojourn in Basel (1772-3), he lived and worked in Paris, producing portraits, calligraphy, and illustrations from his own designs and those of other artists.

References

1743 births
1790 deaths
German draughtsmen
German engravers